Steven LaBrie (born March 4, 1988, Dallas, Texas) is an American baritone, best known as a member of the Classical crossover group Il Divo.

Life and career
LaBrie is a musician at the Met Opera and associate artistic director of vocal arts at the Juilliard School. LaBrie was named among the five leading lyric baritones to watch by Opera News.

He is also a member of the contemporary classical crossover vocal quartet Il Divo since 2022. He was recruited to fill in for Carlos Marín following his death.

References 

American baritones
American male singers
1988 births
Living people